Sacombe is a village and civil parish in the East Hertfordshire district, of Hertfordshire, England. At the 2001 census it had a population of 165. Sacombe is located about 4 miles N N W of Ware; other nearby settlements include Dane End and Sacombe Green.

Religious sites

There appears to have been a church in the parish in 1086, which may have been dedicated to St Mary. The present Anglican Church of St Catherine is largely 14th Century, but was restored in 1855/56, the work being funded by Abel Smith of Woodhall Park. The building is faced with knapped flint and has a four-stage tower. It is a Grade II* listed building

The parish of Sacombe is the smallest in the Diocese of St Albans, and forms part of the benefice of Standon and The Mundens with Sacombe, with worship shared between St Catherine's and churches at Little Munden and Standon.
The church was used as a location for the 2001 film Enigma based on the book of the same name by Robert Harris  about the codebreakers of Bletchley Park in World War II.

References

External links 
 Listed buildings in Sacombe

Villages in Hertfordshire
Civil parishes in Hertfordshire
East Hertfordshire District